The Roman Catholic Diocese of Kahama is a diocese located in Kahama in the Ecclesiastical province of Tabora in Tanzania.

History
 November 11, 1983: Established as Diocese of Kahama from the Metropolitan Archdiocese of Tabora

Leadership
 Bishops of Kahama (Roman rite)
 Bishop Matthew Shija (November 11, 1983 – April 24, 2001)
 Bishop Ludovic Minde, O.S.S. (April 24, 2001 – December 2, 2019), appointed Bishop of Moshi 
 Bishop Christopher Ndizeye Nkoronko (since June 23, 2022)

See also
Roman Catholicism in Tanzania

Sources
 Catholic Hierarchy Information

References
GCatholic.org
Catholic Hierarchy

1983 establishments in Tanzania
Christian organizations established in 1983
Roman Catholic dioceses and prelatures established in the 20th century
Kahama
Kahama, Roman Catholic Diocese of